Compsodrillia torvita is an extinct species of sea snail, a marine gastropod mollusk in the family Pseudomelatomidae, the turrids and allies.

Description
The length of the shell attains 38 mm.

Distribution
Fossils have been found in Miocene strata of the Shimajiri Formation of Okinawa

References

External links
    F. Stearns MacNeil, Tertiary and Quaternary Gastropoda of Okinawa, Geological Survey Professional Paper, United States Government Printing Office, Washington 1960
  "Occasional papers of the California Academy of Sciences": Compsodrillia torviar

torvita
Gastropods described in 1960